Tour of Kavkaz is a cycling race held annually in Russia. It is part of UCI Europe Tour in category 2.2.

Winners

References

Cycle races in Russia
2014 establishments in Russia
Recurring sporting events established in 2014
UCI Europe Tour races